The Tarra Fault is a thrust fault in the department of Norte de Santander in Colombia.

Etymology 
The fault is named after the Tarra River.

Description 
The Tarra Fault is located northwest of the city of Cúcuta and Las Mercedes Fault. The fault thrusts Precambrian and Paleozoic rocks over Cretaceous rocks. It has a very pronounced morphologic expression along the base of the mountain front through the western side of the Tarra valley. The strong topographic signature of the scarp suggests, according to Page (1986), that the fault is as active as other known Quaternary faults in the region. The fault runs from El Tarra in the north to Hacari in the south.

See also 

 List of earthquakes in Colombia
 Bucaramanga-Santa Marta Fault
 Caño Tomás Fault

References

Bibliography

Maps

Further reading 
 

Seismic faults of Colombia
Thrust faults
Active faults
Faults